{{safesubst:#invoke:RfD||2=Turkish invasion|month = March
|day =  4
|year = 2023
|time = 07:08
|timestamp = 20230304070811

|content=
REDIRECT 2019 Turkish offensive into north-eastern Syria

}}